Scott Leggett was a professional American football player who played offensive lineman for two seasons for the Philadelphia Eagles.

References

1962 births
1997 deaths
American football offensive guards
American football centers
Philadelphia Eagles players
Oklahoma Sooners football players